Bombus angustus is a species of bumblebee. It is endemic to Taiwan.

It is the most common species used in bumblebee soup.

References

Bumblebees
Insects of Taiwan
Insects described in 1948